Gobardiha is a village of Gadawa Village Council in Dang Deukhuri District in Lumbini Province of south-western Nepal. At the time of the 2011 Nepal census, it had a population of 15,322, where the total female population was 7991 and the male population was 7331 in 2,873 individual households.

References

External links
UN map of the municipalities of Dang Deukhuri District Dang Deukhuri District

Populated places in Dang District, Nepal